Shekar Bolaghi may refer to:
 Shekar Bolaghi-ye Olya
 Shekar Bolaghi-ye Sofla